Olga Olegovna Stulneva (née Fyodorova, sometimes listed as Fedorova; born July 14, 1983 in Alapayevsk, Russian SFSR) is a Russian athlete and bobsledder.
She's married with bobsledder Alexey Stulnev.

Athletics career
Mainly competing in the 100 metres, her greatest success has come in relay races, where she earned an Olympic silver medal in the 4 × 100 m relay at the 2004 Summer Olympics in Athens.

Personal bests
100 metres – 11.21 (2005)
200 metres – 23.19 (2004)

International competitions

Bobsleigh career
Switching to bobsleigh in 2006, Fyodorova's best World Cup finish was fifth twice with one in 2006 and on in 2008.

Her best finish at the FIBT World Championships was seventh in the two-woman event at St. Moritz in 2007. Fyodorova finished 18th in the two-woman event at the 2010 Winter Olympics in Vancouver. She competed at the 2014 Winter Olympics in the two-woman event where she finished in 9th place but was disqualified for a doping violation on 24 November 2017.

Education
In 2008 Stulneva graduated from the chair "Multimedia Technology" of the Ural State Technical University in Ekaterinburg majoring in computer science.

See also
List of doping cases in athletics

References

External links
 
 Olga Fedorova at USTU  
 
 
 
 

1983 births
Living people
People from Alapayevsk
Sportspeople from Sverdlovsk Oblast
Russian female bobsledders
Russian female sprinters
Olympic athletes of Russia
Olympic bobsledders of Russia
Olympic silver medalists for Russia
Olympic silver medalists in athletics (track and field)
Athletes (track and field) at the 2004 Summer Olympics
Bobsledders at the 2010 Winter Olympics
Bobsledders at the 2014 Winter Olympics
Medalists at the 2004 Summer Olympics
World Athletics Championships athletes for Russia
World Athletics Championships medalists
Russian Athletics Championships winners
Russian sportspeople in doping cases
Doping cases in bobsleigh
Doping cases in athletics